Lillian Helena Smith (17 March 1887 — 5 January 1983) was the first British Empire children's librarian. During her career, Smith set up library spaces for children in Toronto schools. She also created a children's literature library classification that was used in Toronto libraries until the late 1970s. The Lillian H. Smith Toronto Public Library branch was posthumously opened and named after Smith in 1995.

Early life and education
On 17 March 1887, Smith was born in London, Ontario. She completed her post-secondary education at Victoria University and completed additional training at the Carnegie Library of Pittsburgh.

Career
After completing her training, Smith began her library career at the New York Public Library and Washington Heights Library in 1911. The next year, Smith moved to the Toronto Public Library and was the first children's librarian in the British Empire.

At the beginning of her forty-year career as a librarian, Smith created guidelines on the inclusion of children's literature in Toronto libraries. In 1931, Smith established a library classification system for children's books. Her library system remained in Toronto libraries until the end of the 1970s. Alternatively, Smith focused on the creation of programs and libraries for children. At the end of her career in 1952, Smith had opened up numerous children's spaces in Toronto libraries and schools and one at The Hospital for Sick Children. Apart from her librarian career, Smith was a teacher and an author.

Death

On 5 January 1983, Smith died in Toronto, Ontario.

Awards and honors
In 1995, the Lilian H. Smith branch of the Toronto Public Library, located on College St. at Huron St., was opened and posthumously named after Smith.

References

External links
 Lillian Helena Smith biography at Ex Libris Association
 Lillian H. Smith website developed by Michael Manchester

1887 births
1983 deaths
Canadian librarians
Canadian women librarians